Herbert Allen "Rap" Dixon (September 15, 1902 – July 20, 1944) was an American outfielder in Negro league baseball for a number of teams. He was born in Kingston, Georgia.

Although Dixon began playing in the league in 1922, he joined the semi-pro Keystone Giants in 1916 at the age of fourteen. Dixon was noticed for his quick and powerful bat by William Strothers, who was building up the independent Giants at the time.

When Dixon began playing for Strothers in the 1920s, the outfield for the Giants was one of the best of all time; Dixon, Oscar Charleston, and Fats Jenkins. The lineup, in its entirety, scored runs at a higher pace than the 1927 New York Yankees. Dixon had many weapons; speed, hitting, and power were all his strengths and he became known as a triple threat. In 1929, he batted .382 with seven home runs, and led the league with six triples.

Dixon was also notable for discovering the Baseball Hall of Famer Leon Day playing in the Baltimore sandlots.

In a doubleheader played on Saturday, July 5, 1930, Dixon helped make history at Yankee Stadium, which, for the first time ever, played host to two Negro league teams. With 20,000 in attendance, Dixon hit one home run in the opener, then two more in the nightcap to help Baltimore salvage a split with the Lincoln Giants.

Dixon also was a teammate of such Hall of Fame greats as Satchel Paige and Judy Johnson when he was with the Pittsburgh Crawfords.

In later years, with the Black Sox, Rap played with his brother Paul and also with Day. Dixon was selected to the East-West All-Star Game in 1933. Also, in 26 games against white major leaguers, he compiled a .372 average.

Dixon died at age 41 in Detroit, Michigan.

References

External links
 and Baseball-Reference Black Baseball stats and Seamheads
  and Seamheads
 

1902 births
1944 deaths
People from Bartow County, Georgia
Baseball players from Georgia (U.S. state)
Sportspeople from the Atlanta metropolitan area
Baltimore Black Sox players
Brooklyn Eagles players
Chicago American Giants players
Harrisburg Giants players
Homestead Grays players
New York Cubans players
Pittsburgh Crawfords players
Philadelphia Stars players
Washington Pilots players
Negro league baseball managers
20th-century African-American sportspeople